Robert "Bob" Joe Welborn (May 5, 1928 – August 10, 1997) of Denton was a NASCAR Grand National Series driver. He was named to NASCAR's 50 Greatest Drivers list in 1998. He won the final three NASCAR Convertible Division championships in 1956, 1957, and 1958.

NASCAR career
Welborn drove in 11 Grand National events in 1953 for Julian Petty and J.O. Goode’s. He had 2 Top-5 finishes and 6 Top-10 finishes.

He drove in 9 events in 1954 for owners Julian Petty, Bob Griffin, and George Hutchens. Welborn had 1 Top-5 and 3 Top-10 finishes.

Welborn drove in 32 of 45 events in Julian Petty and his cars. He won the pole at Greenville-Pickens Speedway. Welborn finished fourth in the 1955 points.

Welborn raced in 6 events in 1956. He also won the NASCAR Convertible Division championship.

Welborn won his first race at Martinsville in 1957, but did not cross the finish line. Lewis "Possum" Jones relieved Welborn halfway through the race, but NASCAR always credits the driver who started the car. He had 1 win and 3 Top-10 finished in 5 events. Welborn also won the NASCAR Convertible series championship.

Welborn had four straight wins (and five total), 1 pole, 10 Top-5, and 15 Top-10 finishes in 1958. He raced in 18 of 51 events, all for Petty Enterprises. He only finished 149th in series points that year because he only participated in 18 of 51 races. He won his third straight NASCAR Convertible championship.

Welborn won the pole position for the 1959 Daytona 500 by winning his qualifying race. He had 5 poles and 3 wins during the season.

Welborn amassed 9 total wins in the 1950s and early 1960s driving his car and one owned by Julian Petty. He made his last NASCAR start in 1964 while driving for Holman-Moody.

Career awards
Welborn was named one of NASCAR's 50 Greatest Drivers in 1998.
He was inducted in the National Motorsports Press Association's Hall of Fame in 1982.

References

External links
Biography at SpeedwayMedia.com

Biography at nascar.com

1928 births
1997 deaths
NASCAR drivers
People from Denton, North Carolina
Racing drivers from North Carolina